Marblehead Rock is an island off Marblehead, Massachusetts.

References

Islands of Essex County, Massachusetts
Marblehead, Massachusetts